Paulo Jorge da Silva Monteiro (born 29 May 1991 in Sousela, Lousada) is a Portuguese footballer who plays for S.C. Freamunde as a left back.

External links

1991 births
Living people
Portuguese footballers
Association football defenders
S.C. Freamunde players
People from Lousada
Sportspeople from Porto District